WM6 may refer to:
WrestleMania VI, a professional wrestling pay-per-view
Windows Mobile 6, a mobile operating system